The Supramonte cave salamander (Speleomantes supramontis) is a species of salamander in the family Plethodontidae, endemic to the island of Sardinia (Italy).

Its natural habitats are temperate forests, rocky areas, caves, and subterranean habitats (other than caves).

It is threatened by habitat loss.

References

Speleomantes
Cave salamanders
Amphibians of Europe
Fauna of Sardinia
Endemic fauna of Sardinia
Amphibians described in 1986
Taxonomy articles created by Polbot